Cleavage and polyadenylation specificity factor subunit 6 is a protein that in humans is encoded by the CPSF6 gene.

Function 

The protein encoded by this gene is one subunit of a cleavage factor required for 3' RNA cleavage and polyadenylation processing. The interaction of the protein with the RNA is one of the earliest steps in the assembly of the 3' end processing complex and facilitates the recruitment of other processing factors. The cleavage factor complex is composed of four polypeptides. This gene encodes the 68kD subunit. It has a domain organization reminiscent of spliceosomal proteins.

Interactions 

CPSF6 has been shown to interact with WWP1 and PLSCR1.

CPSF6 plays an important role in the nuclear import and integration of HIV-1 capsids.

References

External links

Further reading